Chișineu-Criș (Hungarian: Kisjenő) is a town in Arad County, Crișana, Romania.

Geography
The town is situated on the north-western side of the county, at a  distance from Arad, the county seat. The town was formed by merging the villages of Chișineu Mic and Pădureni. The town administers one village, Nădab (Nadab).

Demographics

In 1910, the town had 2821 inhabitants: 1376 (48.8%) spoke Hungarian, 1355 (48%) spoke Romanian, 49 (1.7%) spoke German.

In 2011, 73.5% of inhabitants were Romanians, 19.3% Hungarians and 6.3% Roma.

Economy
Although the town economy is predominant agricultural, during the last decade the second and third economic sectors had a growing evolution. For most of the tourists Chișineu-Criș is a transit town towards central and Western Europe. The most attractive sightseeing spot of the town is the Crișul Alb River and its banks covered with abundant vegetation.

Tourist attractions
The archaeological discoveries brought to light traces of habitation much older than the documentary attestation of the town. The most important archaeological discoveries that attest the continuity of habitation in the area revealed objects older than 2,500 years in several locations of the town. Also two settlements dated back to the 3rd5th and 10th11th centuries were found here.

Chișineu-Criș was first mentioned as "villa Jeneusol" in the years 1202–1203. Nădab village is attested in a document of 1334 as "Nodob".

Natives
 John Balaban
 Zoltan Balogh
 Adalbert Boros
 Claudiu Drăgan
 Gheorghe Gaston Marin
 George Pirtea
 Sergiu Samarian

References

Populated places in Arad County
Towns in Romania
Localities in Crișana